Alfred Gerstenbrand (18 February 1881 – 7 January 1977) was an Austrian painter. His work was part of the art competitions at the 1936 Summer Olympics and the 1948 Summer Olympics.

References

1881 births
1977 deaths
20th-century Austrian painters
Austrian male painters
Olympic competitors in art competitions
Artists from Vienna
20th-century Austrian male artists